In ancient Greek religion and mythology, Phoebe (associated with  phoîbos, "shining") was one of the first generation of Titans, who were one set of sons and daughters of Uranus and Gaia. She was the grandmother of the sun god Apollo, the moon goddess Artemis, and the witchcraft goddess Hecate. According to myth, she was the original owner of the Oracle of Delphi before gifting it to her grandson Apollo. Her name, meaning "bright", was also given to a number of lunar goddesses like Artemis and later the Roman goddesses Luna and Diana, but Phoebe herself was not actively treated as a moon goddess on her own right in ancient mythology.

Etymology 
Greek , feminine form of  means "pure, bright". Another meaning is "prophet", a reference to her role in myth. Used for water and fire both, it can thus be explained as generally meaning "pure", "clear", or "bright".

Family 
Phoebe is a Titaness, one of the twelve (or thirteen) divine children born to Uranus (Sky) and Gaia (Earth). Phoebe's consort was her brother Coeus, with whom she had two daughters, first Leto, who bore Apollo and Artemis, and then Asteria, a star goddess who bore an only daughter, Hecate. Hesiod in the Theogony describes Phoebe as "" (khrysostéphanos, meaning "golden-crowned").

Mythology 

Through Leto, Phoebe was the grandmother of Apollo and Artemis. The names Phoebe and Phoebus (masculine) came to be applied as synonyms for Artemis/Diana and Apollo respectively, as well as for Luna and Sol, the lunar goddess and the solar god, by the Roman poets; the late-antiquity grammarian Servius writes that "Phoebe is Luna, like Phoebus is Sol." Phoebe was, like Artemis, identified by Roman poets with the Roman moon goddess Diana. Phoebe means "bright" but is functionally only a name; in mythology, the role of moon goddess is fulfilled by other deities as her grandchildren inherit her name.

According to a speech that Aeschylus puts into the mouth of the Delphic priestess herself in The Eumenides, Phoebe received control of the Oracle at Delphi from her sister Themis, who herself had received it from their mother Gaia, and then passed it on Apollo, her grandson, as a gift for his birthday: D. S. Robertson noted "Phoebe in this succession seems to be his private invention,"  reasoning that in the three great allotments of oracular powers at Delphi, corresponding to the three generations of the gods, "Ouranos, as was fitting, gave the oracle to his wife Gaia and Kronos appropriately allotted it to his sister Themis." Robertson also speculates that in Zeus' turn to make the gift, Aeschylus could not report that the oracle was given directly to Apollo, who had not yet been born, and thus Phoebe was interposed.  These supposed male delegations of the powers at Delphi as expressed by Aeschylus are not borne out by the usual modern reconstruction of the sacred site's pre-Olympian history.

Phoebe's  name appears on the southeast corner of the Pergamon Altar which depicts the Gigantomachy, fighting against a Giant with animal features, similar to the one her daughter Leto is fighting. Phoebe, wearing a diadem and a very creased dress, is seen wielding a flaming torch and fighting next to her other daughter Asteria.

Legacy 
Phoebe, one of the moons of Saturn is named after this goddess, as sister of Cronus, Saturn's Greek equivalent. Phoebe (also spelled Phebe) is also a popular feminine given name in the English-speaking world.

Genealogy

See also 
 Dione
 Cassandra
 Crius

Notes

References 
 Aeschylus, Eumenides in Aeschylus, with an English translation by Herbert Weir Smyth, Ph.D. in two volumes. 2. Eumenides. Herbert Weir Smyth, Ph.D. Cambridge, MA. Harvard University Press. 1926.
 Aeschylus, Persians. Seven against Thebes. Suppliants. Prometheus Bound. Edited and translated by Alan H. Sommerstein. Loeb Classical Library No. 145. Cambridge, Massachusetts: Harvard University Press, 2009. . Online version at Harvard University Press.
 Athanassakis, Apostolos N., and Benjamin M. Wolkow, The Orphic Hymns, Johns Hopkins University Press; owlerirst Printing edition (May 29, 2013). . Google Books.
 Apollodorus, Apollodorus, The Library, with an English Translation by Sir James George Frazer, F.B.A., F.R.S. in 2 Volumes. Cambridge, Massachusetts, Harvard University Press; London, William Heinemann Ltd. 1921. Online version at the Perseus Digital Library.
 Boyle, A. J. (editor), Seneca: Medea: Edited with Introduction, Translation, and Commentary, OUP Oxford, 2014. .
 Caldwell, Richard, Hesiod's Theogony, Focus Publishing/R. Pullins Company (June 1, 1987). .
 Hesiod, Theogony, in The Homeric Hymns and Homerica with an English Translation by Hugh G. Evelyn-White, Cambridge, Massachusetts., Harvard University Press; London, William Heinemann Ltd. 1914. Online version at the Perseus Digital Library.
 Homeric Hymn to Hermes (4), in The Homeric Hymns and Homerica with an English Translation by Hugh G. Evelyn-White, Cambridge, Massachusetts., Harvard University Press; London, William Heinemann Ltd. 1914. Online version at the Perseus Digital Library.
 Honan, Mary McMahon, Guide to the Pergamon Museum, De Gruyter, 1904. . Online version at De Gruyter.
 Maurus Servius Honoratus, In Vergilii carmina comentarii. Servii Grammatici qui feruntur in Vergilii carmina commentarii; recensuerunt Georgius Thilo et Hermannus Hagen. Georgius Thilo. Leipzig. B. G. Teubner. 1881. Online version at the Topos Text.
 Picón, Carlos A.; Hemingway, Seán, Pergamon and the Hellenistic Kingdoms of the Ancient World, Yale University Press, 2016, .
 Ridgway, Brunilde Sismondo, Hellenistic Sculpture II: The Styles of ca. 200–100 B.C., The University of Wisconsin Press, 2000.
 Robertson, D.S., "The Delphian Succession in the Opening of the Eumenides" The Classical Review 55.2 (September 1941, pp. 69–70). .

External links 

 PHOEBE from The Theoi Project
 Phoebe from Mythopedia
 Phoebe from greekmythology.com

Greek goddesses
Titans (mythology)
Children of Gaia
Light goddesses
Lunar goddesses
Oracular goddesses
Apollo
Ancient Delphi
Classical oracles
Artemis
Diana (mythology)
Luna (goddess)